The following are notable people who were either born, raised, or have lived for a significant period of time in Tirana, Albania.

List 

Beqir Balluku – former member of the Politburo; accused as organizer of a coup d'etat in 1974, and sentenced to death
Erjon Bogdani – football player
Albert Brojka – former Tirana mayor
Pirro Çako – singer and composer
Fabiola Laco Egro - social activist
Shpresa Gjongecaj - archaeologist and numismatist
Besiana Kadare - Albanian Ambassador to the United Nations
 Ismail Kadare (born 1936)  – novelist and poet, winner of the 2005 Man Booker International Prize, the 2009 Prince of Asturias Award, and the 2015 Jerusalem Prize.
Kledi Kadiu – dancer and actor; lives and works in Italy
Sali Kelmendi – former Tirana mayor
Vedat Kokona – translator of the Albanian language
Maksim Konomi – politician
Saimir Kumbaro – film director
Elsa Lila – singer
Leka, Crown Prince of Albania – heir of King Zog I
Masiela Lusha – actress, poet, and writer
Pandeli Majko – twice Prime Minister of Albania
Rexhep Meidani – former President of Albania
Aleksandër Meksi – former Prime Minister
Inva Mula – opera singer
Elvis Naçi – Imam 
Blendi Nallbani – football player
Fatos Nano – former Prime Minister of Albania
Agim Nesho – former Ambassador
Essad Pasha – politician
Aleksandër Peçi – composer
Edi Rama – Prime Minister of Albania
Skënder Sallaku – comic actor
Klodiana Shala – athlete
Bamir Topi – former President of Albania
Abdi bej Toptani – signatory of the Albanian Declaration of Independence
Murat bej Toptani – signatory of the Albanian Declaration of Independence
Gjergj Xhuvani – film director
Zenel Bastari - Albanian Poet of the Ottoman era.
Haxhi Ymer Kashari - Albanian Poet of the 18th century.
Erion Veliaj - Current Mayor of Tirana.
Ronela Hajati - singer-songwriter and dancer, Albanian representative at the Eurovision Song Contest 2022

See also 
 List of Albanians

Tirana
Tirana